This is a list of ecoregions in Honduras as defined by the World Wildlife Fund and the Freshwater Ecoregions of the World database.

Terrestrial ecoregions

Tropical and subtropical moist broadleaf forests
 Central American Atlantic moist forests
 Central American montane forests

Tropical and subtropical dry broadleaf forests
 Central American dry forests

Tropical and subtropical coniferous forests
 Central American pine–oak forests
 Miskito pine forests

Mangroves
 Gulf of Fonseca mangroves
Mosquitia–Nicaraguan Caribbean Coast mangroves	
 Northern Honduras mangroves

Freshwater ecoregions

Tropical and subtropical coastal rivers
 Chiapas–Fonseca
 Quintana Roo–Motagua
 Mosquitia
 Estero Real–Tempisque

Marine ecoregions

Tropical Northwestern Atlantic
 Western Caribbean (includes the Mesoamerican Barrier Reef)
 Southwestern Caribbean

Tropical East Pacific
 Chiapas-Nicaragua

References

 
Honduras
Ecoregions